Duvier Díaz Balanta (born 21 August 1994) is a Colombian footballer who currently plays as a defender for Celaya.

Career statistics

Club

Notes

References

1994 births
Living people
Colombian footballers
Colombian expatriate footballers
Association football defenders
Ascenso MX players
Irapuato F.C. footballers
Expatriate footballers in Mexico
Colombian expatriate sportspeople in Mexico
Sportspeople from Cauca Department